Émile Aillaud (18 January 1902 in Mexico City – 29 December 1988 in Paris) was a French architect.

His design can be found after World War II in France, such as Les Courtilières in Pantin (1955–56, 1957–60), Wiesberg at Forbach (1959, 1961 ff.) and La Grande Borne at Grigny (1964–71), are representative of the attempts to compensate for the uniformity which resulted from extensively industrialized constructional methods (principally heavy construction employing prefabricated reinforced-concrete panels) by adopting more individualizing urban planning strategies.

This is chiefly achieved in the overall arrangement of the building masses, reduced to smooth abstract forms, in curved serpentine compositions; through the integration of works of art; and finally through the careful handling of public spaces, at times eccentrically shaped and colourfully treated. The residents are thereby given an impetus to identify with their environment.

References

Bibliography
Émile Aillaud, Desordre apparent, ordre caché, Librarie Artheme Fayard, Paris, 1975.  
Émile Aillaud, Chanteloup les Vignes, Librarie Artheme Fayard, Paris, 1978. 
Gerald Gassiot-Talabot, Alain Devy, La Grande Borne, Librarie Hachette, Paris, 1972.

External links
 
 http://eras.free.fr/html/archi/aillaud.html

1902 births
1988 deaths
Lycée Henri-IV alumni
20th-century French architects
French expatriates in Mexico